Judenburg is a historic town in Styria, Austria.

It is the administrative centre of the Murtal district, which was created on 1 January 2012 from the former Judenburg District and former Knittelfeld District. Until 31 December 2011, it was the capital of the Judenburg District.

On 1 January 2015, the adjoining municipalities of Oberweg and Reifling were merged into Judenburg.

Geography
It is located in the Upper Styrian region, on the western end of the Aichfeld basin, stretching along the Mur River from Judenburg down to Knittelfeld in the east. The broad valley is bound by the Niedere Tauern range in the north and the Noric Alps (Lavanttal Alps) in the south.

The municipal area also comprises the cadastral communities of Tiefenbach and Waltersdorf, a former municipality incorporated in 1963.

The municipal area includes the following ten villages (populations as of January 1, 2020):
 Auerling (129)
 Feeberg (176)
 Gasselsdorf (28)
 Judenburg (8,386)
 Oberweg (517)
 Ossach (45)
 Reifling (57)
 Ritzersdorf (15)
 Strettweg (367)
 Waltersdorf (133)

History

Archaeological findings indicate that the area was settled at least since the days of the Celtic kingdom of Noricum. The name literally means "Jews' Borough", referring to the town's origin as a trading outpost on the route from the Mur Valley across the Obdach Saddle mountain pass to Carinthia, in which Jews played an important role, being represented in the city's coat of arms.

Upon the extinction of the Eppensteiner dynasty in 1122, the estates passed to the Styrian Otakars and in 1192 to the House of Babenberg, Dukes of Austria since 1156. Judenburg received town privileges in 1224 and the right to collect tolls in 1277. The town grew to an important commercial centre for iron ore mined at nearby Eisenerz, but also for valeriana celtica used in perfumes during the 13th and 14th century. Judenburg was even granted a valeriana trade monopoly by the Habsburg emperor Frederick III in 1460. After several pogroms, all Jews were expelled from the Duchy of Styria by order of Emperor Maximilian I in 1496. Following his breakthrough in Italy, General Napoléon Bonaparte made his headquarters at Judenburg and it was there, on the night of 7–8 April 1796, that he signed the Truce of Judenburg with the Austrians.

In the beginning of the 20th century, the town was one of the centres of Austria-Hungary's steel industry and also a garrison town of the Austro-Hungarian Army. From 1910 to 1914 one of the first trolleybusses in Austria connected Judenburg station with the town's centre. Today, little remains of the former industry, but Judenburg remains an industrial and trade centre. In May 1918, the town was the site of a failed military mutiny.

In 1938, with the annexation of Austria by Nazi Germany, Judenburg became part of the Third Reich. However, the planned renaming was indefinitely postponed after the outbreak of war and ultimately never happened.

During the Second World War, a subcamp of Mauthausen concentration camp was located nearby, where a displaced persons' reception centre was established after the war. Judenburg was also one of several towns that saw the handover of Cossacks to the Red Army.

Politics

Seats in the municipal assembly as of the 2020 elections:
Social Democratic Party of Austria (SPÖ): 13
Austrian People's Party (ÖVP): 7
Communist Party of Austria (KPÖ): 2
The Greens - The Green Alternative (die Grüne): 2
Freedom Party of Austria (FPÖ): 1

International relations

Twin towns - Sister cities
Judenburg is a member of the Douzelage, a unique town twinning association of 24 towns across the European Union. This active town twinning began in 1991 and there are regular events, such as a produce market from each of the other countries and festivals. Discussions regarding membership are also in hand with three further towns (Agros in Cyprus, Škofja Loka in Slovenia, and Tryavna in Bulgaria).

Notable people

Harald Bosio (1906–1980), skier
Renate Götschl (born 1975), skier
Gernot Jurtin (1955–2006), football player
Vinzenz Kaiser (1904-1945), SS-officer
Thomas Krammer (born 1983), football player
Niki Lauda (1949-2019), F1 driver/airline owner
Michael Madl (born 1988), football player
Christian Muthspiel (born 1962), jazz musician
Wolfgang Muthspiel (born 1965), jazz musician
Christian Pfannberger (born 1979), racing cyclist
Walter Pfrimer (1881–1968), politician and Nazi, known for the 1931 Pfrimer Putsch
Alf Poier (born 1967), singer-songwriter and comedian
Stefan Posch (born 1997), football player
Michael Powolny (1871–1954), artist
Herfried Sabitzer (born 1969), football player
Gernot Sick (born 1978), football player
Christoph Sumann (born 1976), biathlete
Jack Unterweger (1950–1994), author and serial killer
Andreas Zuber (born 1983), racing driver

References

External links

Official homepage
Judenburg tourism

 
Jewish communities in Austria